Sir David William Brewer,  (born 28 May 1940) is an English marine insurance broker who served as Lord Mayor of London (2005–06) and Lord-Lieutenant of Greater London to Elizabeth II (2008–15).

Early life

Brewer grew up in Hampstead and was educated at St Paul's School, London. He later studied at the University of Grenoble in France.

Career

Business
Brewer began his 50-year career with marine insurance company Sedgwick Collins in 1959. In 1976 he went to Tokyo to open the Sedgwick Group's Japan office and lived there for 3 years. He set up its group office in China in 1981, obtaining the first broker's authorisation in 1993. He also opened the company's representative office in Bombay in 1986. He was Non-Executive Vice-Chairman of Marsh Ltd., the company which bought Sedgwick, from 2007–09. He has been a director or consultant for various insurance companies. He was Chairman of the China-Britain Business Council until 2013 and holds Non-Executive Directorships of LIFFE Administration and Management (2009–present), Tullett Prebon SITICO (China) (2006–present) and the National Bank of Kuwait (International) (2007–present).

Public service
Brewer was appointed as a magistrate in 1979. Prior to serving as Alderman of the Ward of Bassishaw 1996–2010, he was a Common Councilman in the City of London; and was Aldermanic Sheriff of the City in 2002/3. His term of office as Lord Mayor of London was 2005–06, and from 2008 to 2015 was HM's representative in Greater London as Lord Lieutenant.

Public life
Brewer is a Past Master of the Worshipful Company of Merchant Taylors as well as of the Blacksmiths' Company, and a Liveryman of the Worshipful Company of Insurers; he has been President of the London Cornish Association since 2005. Sir David has been since 2017 the Chairman of the Central Council of the Royal Over-Seas League.

Personal life
In 1985, Brewer married Tessa Jordá, daughter of Enrique Jordá and President of the Chartered Institute of Linguists. They have two daughters (Olivia and Gabriella). Lady Brewer was awarded an OBE in the Queen's Birthday Honours List for her work as Chairwoman of the City of London Festival.

He lists his recreations as music, golf and chocolate. Another activity he claims to enjoy is paronomasia (puns). He is a member of Marylebone Cricket Club. Sir David and Lady Brewer have a home at Hellandbridge, near Bodmin, in Cornwall.

Honours
Brewer was appointed a Companion of the Order of St Michael and St George (CMG) in the 1999 Birthday Honours for "services to Export" and made a Knight of the Order of St John (KStJ) in 2005. He subsequently was knighted in the 2007 New Year Honours for "services to the City of London" and awarded the same year the Gold Rays with Neck Ribbon of the Japanese Order of the Rising Sun. In the 2015 New Year Honours  he was made a Commander of the Royal Victorian Order (CVO) for his "services as Lord-Lieutenant of Greater London" and on 23 April 2016 appointed a Knight Companion of the Order of the Garter (KG). He furthermore received honorary doctorates from a number of universities, i.e. in 2008 from respectively the City University London (honorary LLD degree), SOAS University of London (honorary DSc degree) and the University of Exeter (honorary LLD degree), and in 2013 from the University of Nottingham (honorary LLD degree).

Styles

 David Brewer (1940–1979)
 David Brewer JP (1979–1999)
 David Brewer CMG JP (1999–2005)
 David Brewer CMG JP KStJ (2005-2007)
 The Right Hon Lord Mayor of London (2005–2006)
 Sir David Brewer CMG JP KStJ (2007–2015)
 Sir David Brewer CMG CVO JP KStJ (2015–2016)
 Sir David Brewer KG CMG CVO JP KStJ (2016–present)

References

Sources
 Seib, Christine. "Business big shot: Sir David Brewer" The Times (London). 3 February 2007.

External links
 Greater London Lieutenancy
 www.cityoflondon.gov.uk

1940 births
Living people
People from Helland
People educated at St Paul's School, London
Companions of the Order of St Michael and St George
Recipients of the Order of the Rising Sun
Knights Bachelor
Businesspeople awarded knighthoods
Sheriffs of the City of London
21st-century lord mayors of London
Lord-Lieutenants of Greater London
Knights of Justice of the Order of St John
Commanders of the Royal Victorian Order
Knights of the Garter